The following elections occurred in the year 1991.

Africa
 1991 Algerian legislative election
 1991 Beninese parliamentary election
 1991 Beninese presidential election
 1991 Burkinabé presidential election
 1991 Cape Verdean parliamentary election
 1991 Cape Verdean presidential election
 1991 Mauritian general election
 1991 Sierra Leonean constitutional referendum
 1991 São Tomé and Príncipe legislative election
 1991 São Tomé and Príncipe presidential election
 1991 Zambian general election

Asia
 1991 Bangladeshi general election
 1991 Nepalese legislative election
 1991 Republic of China National Assembly election
 1991 Singaporean general election
 1991 Sarawak state election
 1991 Uzbekistani presidential election
 1991 Turkish general election

India
 1991 Indian general election
 Indian general election in Andhra Pradesh, 1991
 Indian general election in Haryana, 1991
 Indian general election in Tamil Nadu, 1991
 1991 Tamil Nadu legislative assembly election

Malaysia
 1991 Sarawak state election

Europe
 1991 Abkhazian New Union Treaty referendum
 1991 Åland legislative election
 1991 Albanian parliamentary election
 1991 Belgian general election
 1991 Bulgarian parliamentary election
 1991 Cypriot legislative election
 Estonian independence referendum, 1991
 1991 Finnish parliamentary election
 1991 Georgian independence referendum
 1991 Icelandic parliamentary election
 1991 Irish local elections
 1991 Macedonian independence referendum
 1991 Norwegian local elections
 1991 Polish parliamentary election
 1991 Portuguese legislative election
 1991 Portuguese presidential election
 1991 Stockholm municipal election
 1991 Swedish general election
 1991 Swedish municipal elections
 1991 Ukrainian independence referendum
 1991 Ukrainian presidential election
 1991 Turkish general election

Austria
 1991 Burgenland state election

Germany
 1991 Rhineland-Palatinate state election

Moldova
 1991 Moldovan presidential election
 1991 Transnistrian independence referendum
 1991 Transnistrian presidential election

Russia
 1991 Russian presidential election
 1991 Russian presidential referendum

Spain
 Elections to the Aragonese Corts, 1991
 Elections to the Corts Valencianes, 1991

United Kingdom
 1991 Hemsworth by-election
 1991 Kincardine and Deeside by-election
 1991 Langbaurgh by-election
 1991 Liverpool Walton by-election
 1991 Monmouth by-election
 1991 Neath by-election
 1991 Ribble Valley by-election

United Kingdom local
 1991 United Kingdom local elections

English local
 1991 Bristol City Council elections
 1991 Manchester Council election
 1991 Trafford Council election
 1991 Wolverhampton Council election

North America
 1989–1991 Belizean municipal elections
 1991 Salvadoran legislative election
 1991 Mexican legislative election

Canada
 1991 Brantford municipal election
 1991 British Columbia general election
 1991 British Columbia recall and initiative referendum
 1991 New Brunswick general election
 1991 Northwest Territories general election
 1991 Ottawa municipal election
 1991 Progressive Conservative Party of New Brunswick leadership election
 1991 Saskatchewan general election
 1991 Toronto municipal election
 1991 Windsor municipal election

Caribbean
 1991 Barbadian general election
 1990–1991 Haitian general election
 1991 Montserratian general election
 1991 Trinidad and Tobago general election

United States
 1991 United States gubernatorial elections
 1991 Houston mayoral election

Oceania
 1991 Vanuatuan general election

Australia
 1991 Menzies by-election
 1991 New South Wales referendum
 1991 New South Wales state election

South America
 1991 Argentine legislative election
 1991 Bolivian municipal elections

See also

 
1991
Elections